RAF Roborough is a former Royal Air Force station in Roborough located  north of Plymouth, Devon which used Plymouth City Airport as their base.

History
RAF Roborough began when the Air Ministry started to use Plymouth City Airport for exercises between the RAF, Royal Navy and the British Army. The Royal Navy started to use the airport in the late 1930s and was renamed RNAS Roborough however on 1 May 1942 the site was taken over by the Air Ministry for Royal Air Force use primarily for RAF Coastal Command.

RNAS Roborough

The Admiralty used the airfield for various duties also the airfield played an important role during the Battle of Britain coming under partial control of the No. 10 Group RAF headquarters at RAF Box and had RAF Middle Wallop as their sector station. The first squadron to use the airfield was No. 247 Squadron RAF between 1 August 1940 and 10 February 1941 flying the Gloster Gladiator II before moving to RAF St Eval on 10 February 1941 however after seven days the squadron moved back to Roborough flying the Hawker Hurricane I before moving out for the last time on 10 May 1941 when the squadron went to RAF Portreath.

 Air Sea Rescue Flight RAF, Roborough (1941)

RAF Roborough

In 1942 the site was taken over by the Royal Air Force for Coastal Command Duties with No. 691 Squadron RAF forming at the airfield on 1 December 1943 flying Hurricane I's, Boulton Paul Defiant I's, Airspeed Oxford I's and Fairey Barracuda II's before leaving on 21 February 1945 moving to RAF Harrowbeer.

Units
The following units were also here at some point:
 'C' Flight of No. 2 Anti-Aircraft Co-operation Unit RAF 
 No. 15 Group Communication Flight RAF
 No. 16 Squadron RAF
 No. 19 Group Communication Flight RAF
 No. 46 Elementary and Reserve Flying Training School RAF
 No. 82 Gliding School RAF
 No. 225 Squadron RAF
 No. 276 Squadron RAF
 801 Naval Air Squadron
 810 Naval Air Squadron
 814 Naval Air Squadron
 815 Naval Air Squadron
 819 Naval Air Squadron
 No. 1623 (Anti-Aircraft Co-operation) Flight RAF

Later use

In the 1950s the Royal Air Force left and the site became Plymouth City Airport.

See also
List of air stations of the Royal Navy
List of former Royal Air Force stations
RAF Fighter Command Order of Battle 1940

References

Citations

Bibliography

External links
Information on the Battle of Britain

Royal Air Force stations in Devon